This is a list of the complete squads for the 2017–18 World Rugby Sevens Series.

Captains for a tournament have their numbers marked in bold.

Argentina 
Coach:  Santiago Gómez Cora

Australia 
Coach:
 Andy Friend – .
 Jarred Hodges – 
 Tim Walsh – .

 Notes:

Canada 
Coach:  Damian McGrath

England 
Coach:  Simon Amor

 Notes:

Fiji 
Coach:  Gareth Baber

France 
Coach:  Jérôme Daret

Kenya 
Coach:  Innocent Simiyu

New Zealand 
Coach:  Clark Laidlaw

 Notes:

Russia 
Coach:  Andrey Sorokin

Samoa 
Coach:  Gordon Tietjens

Scotland 
Coach:  John Dalziel

South Africa 
Coach:  Neil Powell

 Notes:

Spain 
Coach:  Pablo Feijoo

United States 
Coach:  Mike Friday

Wales 
Coach:  Gareth Williams

Non-core teams
One place in each tournament of the series is allocated to a national team based on performance in the respective continental tournaments within Africa, Asia, Europe, Oceania, and the Americas.

Ireland
Coach:  Anthony Eddy

Japan
Coach:  Damian Karauna

Papua New Guinea
Coach:  Douglas Guise

South Korea
Coach:  Chang Ryul Choi

Uganda
Coach:  Tolbert Onyango

Uruguay
Coach:  Luis Pedro Achard

See also
 2017–18 World Rugby Women's Sevens Series squads

References

Squads
World Rugby Sevens Series squads